Aulonemia is a genus of Latin American bamboo in the grass family.

Species

Formerly included
see Colanthelia Olmeca 
 Aulonemia cingulata - Colanthelia cingulata  
 Aulonemia clarkiae - Olmeca clarkiae 
 Aulonemia fulgor - Olmeca fulgor  
 Aulonemia intermedia - Colanthelia intermedia  
 Aulonemia lanciflora - Colanthelia lanciflora

See also
List of Poaceae genera

References

 
Bambusoideae genera